The Dzerzhinskaya Line is a line of the Novosibirsk Metro. The history of the line begins with the original Metro design plan, which despite numerous attempts could not make a provision to include the central railway terminal, something crucial for the Metro to become the city's main artery. Thus in early 1980s, whilst the construction of the first line was underway, construction of a two station second line was started. These were opened in 1987, two years after the first line.    It was originally intended that in the mid -1990s the construction of the westward extension would begin, however with the lack of finances that plan had to wait for more than ten years before the new stations could finally begin opening in the 2000s.

Timeline

Transfers

Rolling stock
Two four-carriage 81-717/714 shuttles are assigned to the line.

Recent developments and future plans
Although the extension to Beryozovaya Roshcha was significant enough to end the shuttle regime on the line, the station was opened with only one tunnel complete. The completion of the second one, originally intended for mid-2006, but offset to 2007 finally allowed for a standard regime to begin. The line was expanded eastwards to Zolotaya Niva in 2010; and further expansion is planned to Dovatora and Volochaevskaya.

References

Novosibirsk Metro
Railway lines opened in 1987